FC Botev is a Bulgarian football club based in Novi Pazar, Shumen Province, which competes in the North-East Third League, the third division of Bulgarian football.

Current squad 
As of 1 September 2018

References

External links 
 Club profile at bgclubs.eu
 Club page at Facebook

Botev
Botev
Botev